Jalalabad Cantonment is a cantonment located in Sylhet, Bangladesh.

Jalalabad Cantonment is the home of the Bangladesh Army's 17th Infantry Division, the School of Infantry & Tactics (SI&T), Para Commando Brigade, 1 & 2 Para commando battalion  of Bangladesh Army.

Installations 
 HQ 17th Infantry Division
 Area Headquarters, Sylhet Division
 School of Infantry and Tactics
 11 Infantry Brigade
 52 Infantry Brigade
 360 Infantry Brigade
 1 Independent Paracommando Brigade 
 17 Artillery Brigade
 17 Military Police
 Station Headquarters, Jalalabad Cantonment
 Cantonment Board, Jalalabad
 Combined Military Hospital
 GE (Army) Jalalabad Cantonment

Education institutions 
Army Institute of Business Administration (AIBA), Sylhet
Jalalabad Cantonment Public School & College
 Jalalabad Cantonment Board High School
 Jalalabad Cantonment English School & College

References 

Cantonments of Bangladesh